Marlon D. Brown (born April 22, 1991) is a former American football wide receiver. He signed with the Baltimore Ravens as an undrafted free agent in 2013. He played college football at Georgia.

Early career
He attended Harding Academy of Memphis in Memphis, Tennessee. He was selected to the 2009 USA Today All-USA Second-team. He also was selected to the 2008 Atlanta Journal-Constitution Super Southern 100. He was named to the 2007 Tennessee Sports Writers Association Division 2-A All-State.

In 2009, he was a recipient of the Vickie and Leon Farmer Football Scholarship. In 2010, he was selected as team's Most Improved Player Award.

Professional career

Baltimore Ravens

2013 season 
On April 28, 2013, Brown signed with the Baltimore Ravens as an undrafted free agent following the 2013 NFL Draft. Brown was one of the 2 rookie free agents to make the 53-man opening day roster. Brown made his NFL debut against the Denver Broncos on September 5, 2013. In that game, Brown recorded his first-career reception and his first-career touchdown. In Week 14 of the 2013 season, he caught the game-winning touchdown from quarterback Joe Flacco with 4 seconds remaining in regulation for a 29–26 victory over the Minnesota Vikings; Brown won NFL Rookie of the Week honors for his performance. Brown led the Ravens in receiving touchdowns and tied the Ravens rookie record for receiving touchdowns in a season with seven, achieving that record against the Cincinnati Bengals; Brown also became the first rookie in Ravens franchise history to score a TD in each of his first two career games. He finished the season with 49 receptions for 524 yards, which ranked 3rd and 2nd on the team, respectively.

2014 season 
In 2014, the Ravens signed wide receiver Steve Smith Sr and Brown was demoted to backup wide receiver. In Brown's second NFL season, he only had 24 receptions for 255 yards with no touchdowns as part of an offense that broke franchise single-season records in yards (5,838) and points scored (409). Brown started his first-career post-season game against the New England Patriots on January 10, 2015. In two playoff games, he caught 6 passes for 48 yards.

2015 season 
Brown suffered a back injury in a Week 11 win against the St. Louis Rams. Brown was inactive for every game until December 29, 2015, when he was placed on injured reserve, ending his season. The injury ended Brown's third season in the NFL with 14 receptions for 112 yards on 30 targets for zero touchdowns.

Denver Broncos 
Brown signed a one-year contract with the Denver Broncos on July 27, 2016. On August 4, 2016, Brown was waived due to a back injury he suffered during training camp. He was re-signed by the Broncos on November 21, 2016. He was placed on injured reserve on December 10, 2016.

Following the pre-season, on September 2, 2017, Brown was released by the Broncos.

Chicago Bears
On April 19, 2018, Brown signed with the Chicago Bears. Following the pre-season, on September 1, 2018, he was placed on injured reserve with a concussion. He was released on October 16, 2018.

References

External links

Georgia Bulldogs bio 
Baltimore Ravens bio

1991 births
Living people
Players of American football from Memphis, Tennessee
African-American players of American football
American football wide receivers
Georgia Bulldogs football players
Baltimore Ravens players
Denver Broncos players
Chicago Bears players
21st-century African-American sportspeople